Uncial 047 (in the Gregory-Aland numbering no. 047, ε 95 von Soden) is a Greek uncial manuscript of the Gospels. The codex is dated paleographically to the 8th century. Formerly the codex was designated by Hebrew letter ב. It has full marginalia.

Description 
The codex contains on 152 parchment leaves (20.5 cm by 15.2 cm) almost complete text of the four Gospels, with some lacunae (Matthew 2-3; 28; Mark 5-6; 8-9; John 12; 14; 17). The text is written partly in double columns and partly in cruciform, 37 or 38 lines per page. Parchment is thick, ink is brown. The letters are small.

There is also a division according to the smaller Ammonian Sections (in Mark sections 237, the last section in 16:15), with references to the Eusebian Canons (written below Ammonian Section numbers).

It does not contain the text of Matthew 16:2b–3, text of John 5:3.4 is present, but they were marked by an obelus in the left-hand margin, indicating that the passage is doubtful. The pericope John 7:53-8:11 is not marked by an obelus or asterisk.

It uses the form  (for 3 person and plural in aoristus), typical of Koine Greek, instead of ειπον, typical of Byzantine Greek.

Lacunae 

Matthew 2:15-3:12; 28:10-20; Mark 5:40-6:18; 8:35-9:19; John 12:16-42; 14:7-15:1; 18:34-21:25.

Text 

The Greek text of this codex is a representative of the Byzantine text-type, Aland gave for it the following textual profile: 1751, 961/2, 62, 21s, and placed it in Category V. Wisse recognized its text – in Luke 1; 10; 20 – as text of the textual family Kx. Hermann von Soden did not classify it in this group.

In John 1:29 it lacks ο Ιωαννης along with manuscripts א, A, B, K, M, N, S, U, Y, Δ, Θ, Π, Ψ, Ω, 0141, 8., 9., 565., 1192.

History 

Currently the manuscript is dated by the INTF to the 8th century.

The codex was discovered by Gregory in 1886, who gave the first description of the codex.

The codex was formerly held in the monastery of St. Andrew on Athos Peninsula. C. R. Gregory examined it in 1886. It was brought by Thomas Whittemore to the United States. Since 1942 the codex has been located in the Princeton University Library (Library Μed. and Ren. Mss, Garrett 1), in Princeton, New Jersey.

See also 
 List of New Testament uncials
 Textual criticism
 Lectionary 233

References

Further reading 

 
 Bruce M. Metzger, Manuscripts of the Greek Bible: An Introduction to Greek Palaeography, Oxford University Press, Oxford, 1991, p. 98, 99 (Plate).

External links 

 R. Waltz, Uncial 047: at the Encyclopedia of Textual Criticism

Greek New Testament uncials
8th-century biblical manuscripts